The following lists events from the year 2018 in the Republic of Macedonia.

Incumbents
 President: Gjorge Ivanov
 Prime Minister: Zoran Zaev

Events

February
 February 7 - Prime Minister Zoran Zaev announces his country is ready to add a geographical qualifier in the country's name to end the dispute with Greece. International Airport Skopje and a key highway have also been renamed.

Deaths

1 December - Ivan Katardžiev, historian (b. 1926).

References

 
Macedonia
Macedonia